Roy Wesseling (born 25 October 1964 in Haarlem) is a Dutch football manager and former player. He took over as coach from Harry van den Ham who had been fired from the position.

References

1964 births
Living people
Dutch footballers
Dutch football managers
Footballers from Haarlem
Association footballers not categorized by position